Deer vetch is a common name for several leguminous plants and may refer to certain species in the following genera:

Acmispon
Aeschynomene
Lotus